"So Close" is a song by British singer Dina Carroll, released as the third single from her album by the same name (1993) in November 1992. Produced by Nigel Lowis, it peaked at number 20 on the UK Singles Chart.

Critical reception
Larry Flick from Billboard described the song as a "plush ballad". He noted that Carroll's "rich and appealing alto is cushioned by soft keyboard lines and warm backing harmonies." Dave Sholin from the Gavin Report complimented "this tastefully-produced, rhythmic ballad". In his weekly UK chart commentary, James Masterton said, "Yep, it's Christmas alright which means that disco divas such as Ms Carroll can follow up club classics like "Ain't No Man" and "Special Kind of Love" with a ballad without any loss of crediblity." A reviewer from Music Week called it "soulful", and a "mature, shimmering, polished ballad on a par with some of Lisa Stansfield's finest work". Pop Rescue stated that Carroll's vocals "are so rich and warm whilst it gently plods along, but you can just tell that she's building up to something wonderful in the chorus – and her vocals really don’t let you down." Phil Shanklin of ReviewsRevues picked it as "one of the highspots" from the album, declaring it as "a stylish ballad" with elements of Phyllis Nelson's 1985 song "Move Closer".

Music video
A music video was produced to promote the single, directed by German feature film director and producer Marcus Nispel. It features Carroll performing in Apollo Theatre.

Track listings

Charts

References

Dina Carroll songs
1990s ballads
1992 singles
1992 songs
A&M Records singles
First Avenue Records singles
Music videos directed by Marcus Nispel
Songs written by Dina Carroll
Songs written by Nigel Lowis